Squalus crassispinus, the fatspine spurdog, is a dogfish of the family Squalidae, found on the continental shelf off the northern coast of Western Australia, at depths of .

Squalus crassispinus is a rare, small and slender dogfish with a broad head and short snout.  There is a broad, small medial barbel on the anterior nasal flaps.  The pectoral fin has a shallowly concave posterior margin.  The first dorsal fin is moderately high, and both dorsal fin spines are very stout.

Coloration is light grey above, paler below, with no white spots.  The pale dorsal fins have dusky tips.

Its reproduction is ovoviviparous.

References
 Compagno, Dando, & Fowler, Sharks of the World, Princeton University Press, New Jersey 2005 

crassispinus
Marine fish of Western Australia
Fauna of Western Australia
Taxa named by Peter R. Last
Taxa named by Matt Edmunds
Taxa named by Gordon K. Yearsley
Fish described in 2007